Maurice Woods (May 28, 1938 – November 1, 1983) was an American actor.

He was an actor, known for Trading Places (1983), Attica (1980) and Will: The Autobiography of G. Gordon Liddy (1982)  

Away from the film industry, Woods was seen in many Off Broadway and Off Off Broadway productions, such as “The Last Street Play”.

On November 1, 1983, Woods died of cancer, in the Lenox Hill Hospital, Manhattan. He was aged 45. He was survived by his wife, Lauren Woods and children, Simeon and Patricia.

References

External links 
 

1938 births
1983 deaths
American male film actors
20th-century American male actors